Striglina strigosa is a species of moth of the family Thyrididae. It is found in India.

References

Moths of Asia
Thyrididae